The ZX Spectrum Vega is a modern redesign of the ZX Spectrum in the form of a miniaturized TV game, that comes preloaded with several games from the platform, created with the involvement of Sir Clive Sinclair.

Hardware 

The Vega mimics the look of the original 48k Spectrum computer, however, the keyboard that consisted of 40 rubber keys has been replaced in favour of a simplified layout consisting of only 13 buttons. On the left a segmented directional pad made of hard red plastic for movement, on the right are four grey rectangular rubber keys that are the same size and shape as the original keys, alongside four smaller square rubber buttons on the bottom, and in the centre lays the reset button. The Iconic rainbow strip that appeared on the bottom right corner of the original has been reduced to a small decal on the corner.

The console connects to the television via an RCA composite cable, and uses a USB cable to draw power, both cables are hardwired to the back of the console. Since the console is meant to be held like a controller, the size of the unit has been reduced to fit in the hands, and the cables measure around 3 metres so it can be comfortably used with some distance between the screen and the user.

On the front, it contains a green LED to indicate the power is on, and a micro SD card slot for adding save files and more titles.

Software 

This micro-console comes pre-loaded with 1000 titles.

History 
In 2014, a £100 Sinclair ZX Spectrum Vega retro video game console was announced by Retro Computers and crowdfunded on IndieGogo, with the apparent backing of Clive Sinclair as an investor, but without a full keyboard and manufactured in a limited capacity.

It was released on 24 April 2015.

See also
 ZX Spectrum Vega+

References 

Home video game consoles
Discontinued video game consoles
ARM-based video game consoles